Cookes House, also known as Tom Paine's House, is a historic home located at York, Pennsylvania, York County, Pennsylvania.  It was built in 1761, and is a two-story, Germanic and Provincial Georgian influenced stone dwelling.  About 1800, it was converted to a double house.  It is the third oldest building in York, after the Gen. Horatio Gates House and Golden Plough Tavern.  It is believed to have been the home of Thomas Paine (1737–1809), while the Second Continental Congress convened in York, September 30, 1777, to June 27, 1778.

It was added to the National Register of Historic Places in 1972.
York Mayor-Elect, current City Council Chairman, and Lower Susquehanna Riverkeeper, Michael Helfrich, currently resides as the sole occupant.

References

External links
Historic York website

Historic American Buildings Survey in Pennsylvania
Continental Congress
Houses on the National Register of Historic Places in Pennsylvania
Houses completed in 1761
Buildings and structures in York, Pennsylvania
Houses in York County, Pennsylvania
National Register of Historic Places in York County, Pennsylvania